William Chawner (born February 1848 at Macclesfield, Cheshire, died  29 March 1911, at Vence, Alpes Maritimes) was an educational reformer and the first layman to be appointed as Master of Emmanuel College, Cambridge.

Life
The son of William Chawner, vicar of Crich from 1855 to 1875, Chawner was educated at Rossall School before matriculating in 1867 at Emmanuel College and graduating as a prizeman in classics in 1871.

Other than a brief period as Assistant Master at Winchester College in 1874, Chawner's life was dedicated to Emmanuel where he became a Fellow in 1871, tutor (1875–90) and master from 1895 until his death in 1911. During his tutorship the college entered upon a period of remarkable growth; as master he was largely instrumental in establishing a scheme of Exhibitions for students preparing for work in elementary schools, in connection with the Day Training College.

A paper, Prove All Things, written by Chawner and read by him to a religious discussion society at Emmanuel in 1909, led to the formation of the Heretics Society.

Chawner served as Vice-Chancellor of the University of Cambridge from 1899 to 1901.

References

1848 births
1911 deaths
People educated at Rossall School
Alumni of Emmanuel College, Cambridge
Masters of Emmanuel College, Cambridge
Vice-Chancellors of the University of Cambridge